The Omega Ω is a V8 engine produced by Hyundai Motor Company. It is a dual overhead cam design with electronic multiport fuel injection or Gasoline Direct Injection.

GDi

4.5L (G8AA)

The G8AA (also called the 4.5D) displaces 4.5 L (4498 cc) with a  bore,  stroke and a 10.7:1 compression ratio.

Applications
 Hyundai Equus (1999–2003)

MPi

4.5L (G8AB)
The G8AB displaces 4.5 L (4498 cc) with a  bore,  stroke.

Applications
 Hyundai Equus (1999–2008)

See also
 List of Hyundai engines

References

Omega
V8 engines